Argobba may refer to:
Argobba people
Argobba language
Argobba special woreda (Afar) in the Afar Region
Argobba special woreda (Amhara) in the Amhara Region

See also
 Argoba Nationality Democratic Organization

Language and nationality disambiguation pages